Gianfranco Gazzana Priaroggia (S 525) is a  of the Italian Navy.

Construction and career
Gianfranco Gazzana Priaroggia was laid down at Fincantieri Monfalcone Shipyard on 12 November 1992 and launched on 26 June 1993. It was commissioned on 12 June 1995.

It is in service in the First Submarine Group based in the naval base of Taranto. The submarine, which was intensively used in training activities, between 1999 and 2002 was subjected to radical works involving the platform and the combat system.

Gallery

Citations

External links
 

1993 ships
Sauro-class submarines
Ships built by Fincantieri